Beefhide Creek is a stream in Letcher and Pike Counties of the U.S. state of Kentucky.

According to tradition, the creek received its name from an early incident in which a cow hide was hung to dry near its banks.

See also
List of rivers of Kentucky

References

Rivers of Letcher County, Kentucky
Rivers of Pike County, Kentucky
Rivers of Kentucky